The 2022 Australian Football League finals series was the 126th annual edition of the VFL/AFL finals series, the Australian rules football tournament staged to determine the winner of the 2022 AFL premiership season. The series was played over four weeks in September and culminated in the 2022 AFL Grand Final.

The top eight teams from the premiership season qualify for the finals series. AFL finals series have been played under the current format since 2000.

Qualification

Venues
The matches of the 2022 AFL finals series were contested at four venues around the country.

The Melbourne Cricket Ground hosted finals for the first year since 2019 (after the 2020 and 2021 finals series were played interstate due to the COVID-19 pandemic) and hosted six finals: both qualifying finals, both semi-finals, the first preliminary final, and the 2022 AFL Grand Final. Perth Stadium and the Brisbane Cricket Ground each hosted one elimination final, and the Sydney Cricket Ground in Sydney hosted a preliminary final for the first time since 1996.

Matches 

The system used for the 2022 AFL finals series is a final eight system. The top four teams in the eight receive the "double chance" when they play in week-one qualifying finals, such that if a top-four team loses in the first week it still remains in the finals, playing a semi-final the next week against the winner of an elimination final. The bottom four of the eight play knock-out games – only the winners survive and move on to the next week. Home-state advantage goes to the team with the higher ladder position in the first two weeks, and to the qualifying final winners in the third week.

In the second week, the winners of the qualifying finals receive a bye to the third week. The losers of the qualifying final plays the elimination finals winners in a semi-final. In the third week, the winners of the semi-finals from week two play the winners of the qualifying finals in from week one. The winners of those matches move on to the grand final.

Week one (qualifying and elimination finals)

Second elimination final (Brisbane Lions vs Richmond)

The Second elimination final saw the sixth-placed  face the seventh-placed , their fourth finals meeting and their third in four seasons, following qualifying finals in both 2019 and 2020. The two sides also met in a preliminary final in 2001.

Scorecard

Second qualifying final (Melbourne vs Sydney)

The Second qualifying final saw second-placed  face third-placed . This was the third finals meeting between the sides, with South Melbourne (now known as Sydney) defeating Melbourne in a 1936 preliminary final, and Melbourne beating Sydney in a semi-final in 1987.

Scorecard

First qualifying final (Geelong vs Collingwood)

The First qualifying final saw minor premiers  face fourth-placed . Geelong and Collingwood met for the 26th time, the most common finals match-up in VFL/AFL history, having met in six grand finals in 1925, 1930, 1937, 1952, 1953 and 2011; qualifying finals in 1981 and 2019; semi-finals in 1901, 1927, 1951, 1952, 1953, 1967, and 2020; and preliminary finals in 1930, 1938, 1955, 1964, 1980, 2007, 2009 and 2010.

Scorecard

First elimination final (Fremantle vs Western Bulldogs)

The First elimination final saw the fifth-placed  face the eighth-placed . This was the first finals meeting between the two sides.

Scorecard

Week two (semi-finals)

Second semi-final (Melbourne vs Brisbane Lions)
The Second semi-final saw the losers of the second qualifying final, host the winners of the second elimination final, .This was the second finals meeting between the two teams in as many years; they previously contested a qualifying final in 2021.

Prior to the game, the MCG was lit in purple as a mark of respect to Elizabeth II and the Royal Family after her death less than 24 hours earlier at the age of 96 at Balmoral Castle.The Indigenous Welcome to Country was then followed by a minute of silence and the playing of both "God Save the King" and "Advance Australia Fair" to pay respects, remember and reflect on "her grit, humility and devotion to the Commonwealth."

Scorecard

First semi-final (Collingwood vs Fremantle)

The First semi-final saw First qualifying final losers  face First elimination final winners  in what was the first finals encounter between the two sides.

Scorecard

Week three

First preliminary final (Geelong vs Brisbane Lions)
This was the third preliminary final clash between the Lions and the Cats since 2004. The Lions won in 2004 at the MCG, with the Cats winning in 2020 at the Gabba.

Scorecard

Second preliminary final (Sydney vs Collingwood)
This was the sixteenth finals meeting between these two clubs, with Collingwood having won eight of the previous fifteen, and with South Melbourne/Sydney winning the other eight. Given the struggles of South Melbourne/Sydney in the second half of the 20th Century, most of the finals played against each other were in the first half of it. 
Their previous finals meetings occurring in: 1907 (semi-finals), 1909 (semi-finals), 1910 (preliminary final), 1911 (semi-finals), 1917 (semi-finals), 1918 (grand final), 1932 (semi-finals), 1943 (semi-finals),1935 (semi-finals and grand final), 1936 (semi finals and grand final), 1945 (semi finals), 2007 (elimination finals), 2012 (preliminary finals). The Swans won the most recent final between the two: the 2012 preliminary final on the way to winning the 2012 premiership. 

The Swans hosted their first preliminary final at the Sydney Cricket Ground since 1996 when Tony Lockett kicked "Plugger's Point", a famous behind scored after the siren to beat Essendon and send Sydney to their first Grand Final since 1945.
Coincidentally, this match also resulted in a 1-point victory for the Swans. 

Collingwood's only losses after Round 9 came at the hands of the two grand finalists. 

Scorecard

Week four (Grand Final)

References

External links

AFL finals series official website

Finals Series, 2022